Eddie the Eagle is a 2015 biographical sports film directed by Dexter Fletcher. The film stars Taron Egerton as Michael Edwards, a British skier who in 1988 became the first competitor to represent Great Britain in Olympic ski jumping since 1928. Hugh Jackman, Christopher Walken, Iris Berben and Jim Broadbent co-star. The film had its first public screening at the Butt-Numb-A-Thon in Austin, Texas on December 12, 2015 and its world premiere at the 2016 Sundance Film Festival on January 26, 2016.

The film was released in the United States on February 26, 2016 by 20th Century Fox and in the United Kingdom on March 28, 2016 by Lionsgate.

The film received generally positive reviews from critics and in 2017 it was nominated for the Empire Award for Best British Film.

Plot
In 1973, after a long period of medical treatment for walking difficulties, ten-year-old Michael "Eddie" Edwards dreams of Olympic glory, trying his hand at various Olympic events and failing. His mother encourages him, while his father discourages him. As a teen, Eddie gives up his dream of participating in the Summer Games in favour of skiing in the Winter Games. Although skilled at the sport, he is rejected by British Olympic officials for being uncouth. Realising he could make the team as a ski jumper (a sport which the United Kingdom has not participated in for six decades), Eddie decamps to a training facility in Garmisch-Partenkirchen, West Germany, where the more seasoned jumpers belittle him.
     
Eddie self-trains, and after successfully completing the  hill on his first try, he injures himself on his first attempt at a  slope. Alcoholic snow groomer Bronson Peary advises Eddie to give up, but Eddie's tenacious spirit and a shared sense of being an outsider convince Bronson to train Eddie. Peary is an American former champion ski jumper who left the sport after a conflict with his mentor, Warren Sharp, as Eddie learns from Petra, a cafe owner who takes him in. With very little time to qualify for the 1988 Winter Olympics in Calgary, Eddie and Bronson employ various unorthodox methods to refine Eddie's form, and he successfully completes the 40m jump. 

To qualify for the British Olympic division in ski jumping, Eddie must complete a jump from a  hill. He manages to land the jump successfully, with a distance of 34 metres (112 ft), thus earning a place on the British Olympic Team. In an effort to keep Eddie from sullying the Winter Games with his amateurish skillset, the officials change their criteria and demand that he jump at least . Eddie decides to continue training and performs on a circuit, his jumps increasing in length each time.

While practicing for the final event before the cutoff date for qualification, Eddie lands a 61m jump exactly, but misses the mark on his official jump and is disqualified. Eddie is about to return home to work with his father when he receives a letter stating that his qualifying practice jump is valid. Bronson advises Eddie wait until the 1992 games and train for the next four years to give himself a better chance of winning a medal, concerned that he will embarrass himself and his country if he goes ahead, but Eddie is undeterred.

Upon arriving in Calgary, Eddie is scorned by the other British competitors, who get him drunk so that he fails to attend the opening ceremonies. His triumphant celebrations win the audience over, and the media embrace him as Eddie "The Eagle". Over the phone, Bronson criticizes Edwards for not taking the sport seriously. Edwards publicly apologises for his behavior and, wanting to ensure he does not leave the games without recognition, he enters the  jump, which he has never attempted before. Bronson now travels to the games to support him.

After an encouraging conversation with his idol Matti "The Flying Finn" Nykänen on the lift to the top of the hill, Eddie miraculously lands a  jump. Once again, he comes last in the event, but is nonetheless cheered by the audience and TV viewers worldwide, which earns him recognition in the closing speech of the President of the Organising Committee for the Olympic Games, Frank King. British Olympic officials grudgingly accept him. Warren Sharp reconciles with Bronson, and Edwards returns home a national hero, welcomed by fans at the airport, as well as his mother and father; the latter reveals he is wearing a jumper that says "I'm Eddie's dad," and says he is proud of him.

Cast

 Taron Egerton as Michael Edwards
 Tom Costello as Michael Edwards at age 10
 Jack Costello as Michael Edwards at age 15
 Hugh Jackman as Bronson Peary
 Christopher Walken as Warren Sharp
 Iris Berben as Petra
 Mark Benton as Richmond, a BOA official
 Keith Allen as Terry Edwards, Eddie's father
 Jo Hartley as Janette Edwards, Eddie's mother
 Ania Sowinski as Carrie
 Tim McInnerny as Dustin Target
 Edvin Endre as Matti "The Flying Finn" Nykänen
 Marc Benjamin as Lars Holbin
 Jim Broadbent as a BBC commentator
 Daniel Ings as Zach
 Rune Temte as Bjørn, a Norwegian coach

Production

Development
Eddie the Eagle is a  co-production of Marv Films (UK), Studio Babelsberg (Germany) and Saville Productions  (US).

Development on the film was first reported in 2007 as a project of Irish director Declan Lowney with Steve Coogan to appear in the lead role. In 2009 Rupert Grint was reportedly linked to the role of Edwards.

In March 2015, it was announced that 20th Century Fox had acquired the film, with Taron Egerton and Hugh Jackman starring and Dexter Fletcher directing, from a screenplay by Sean Macaulay and Simon Kelton. Egerton would portray Eddie "The Eagle" Edwards, while Jackman would portray Bronson Peary, his coach; Jackman's character was confirmed as fictional by Eddie Edwards. It was also announced that Matthew Vaughn, who produced Kingsman: The Secret Service, would reunite with the studio, serving as a producer on the film, while Adam Bohling, David Reid, Rupert Maconick and Valerie Van Galde would also serve as producers.  That same month, it was announced that Christopher Walken had joined the film, portraying the role of Jackman's character's mentor.

The film received funds of €2.2 million from the German Federal Film Fund (DFFF).

Filming
Principal photography took place in Oberstdorf and Garmisch-Partenkirchen in Bavaria, in Seefeld in Tirol, at the Pinewood Studios and in London from 9 March to 3 May 2015. Dry slope scenes were filmed at a dry ski slope in Bracknell, Berkshire, UK.

Release
In March 2015, it was announced 20th Century Fox would distribute the film in the United States of America. The studio set 29 April 2016 for the release of the film. That same month, it was announced that Lionsgate had acquired United Kingdom distribution rights to the film, with a spring 2016 release planned. In October 2015, Lionsgate set a release date for the film for 1 April 2016. The date was then moved forward to 28 March 2016. The same month, it was announced that the film had delayed to 26 February in the United States. The film had its world premiere at the 2016 Sundance Film Festival as a "Surprise Screening" on 26 January 2016. The subsequent London premiere took place on 17 March 2016.

Soundtrack
Fly (Songs Inspired by the Film Eddie the Eagle), curated by Gary Barlow, was released on 18 March 2016. It features new songs by Tony Hadley, Marc Almond, Holly Johnson, Paul Young, Kim Wilde, Andy Bell, Midge Ure, Nik Kershaw, ABC, Deacon Blue, Van Halen, Go West, Howard Jones, OMD and Heaven 17. It is an album of new studio recordings and original songs, curated by Barlow at the behest of producer Matthew Vaughn.

Eddie the Eagle (Original Motion Picture Score) was released a week before the curated album above, and features the film's original score by Matthew Margeson.

Reception

Box office
Eddie the Eagle grossed a worldwide total of $46.1 million. In the UK, it grossed $12.8 million, making it the highest grossing British film released in the UK in 2016. In the United States, the film debuted to $8.1 million, finishing third.

Critical response
On Rotten Tomatoes, the film has a rating of 82% based on 199 reviews, with an average rating of 6.60/10. The site's consensus reads, "Eddie the Eagles amiable sweetness can't disguise its story's many inspirational clichés – but for many viewers, it will be more than enough to make up for them." On Metacritic the film has a score of 54 out of 100, based on reviews from 34 critics, indicating "mixed or average reviews". Audiences polled by CinemaScore gave the film an average grade of "A" on an A+ to F scale.

Alonso Duralde of TheWrap wrote, "Eddie the Eagle is designed for audiences who will throw their weight behind the film’s schmaltz and sentimentality. Anyone unwilling to commit to the movie’s shamelessness will feel like they’ve hit the ground headfirst." KenyaBuzz called it a must-watch saying it is "positively impetuous and unbearably affectionate." A reviewer who attended the events in which the real Eddie competed, wrote "three generations of my family loved this film. You can't believe most of it, but you can believe in it. That's a subtle but important difference."

Accolades

See also
 Cool Runnings

References

External links
 
 
 

2015 films
2010s biographical films
2010s sports comedy-drama films
20th Century Fox films
American biographical films
American sports comedy-drama films
Babelsberg Studio films
British biographical films
British sports comedy-drama films
Biographical films about sportspeople
Films directed by Dexter Fletcher
Films scored by Matthew Margeson
Films set in West Germany
Films set in England
Films set in Calgary
Films set in the Alps
Films shot in Germany
Films shot in London
Films shot in England
Films about the 1988 Winter Olympics
1988 Winter Olympics
Films set in 1973
Films set in 1978
Films set in 1988
English-language German films
German sports comedy-drama films
Films about Olympic ski jumping
Films shot at Pinewood Studios
Marv Films films
TSG Entertainment films
Lionsgate films
Films set in Gloucestershire
Films produced by Matthew Vaughn
Cultural depictions of British men
Cultural depictions of skiers
Sports films based on actual events
Comedy films based on actual events
American films based on actual events
British films based on actual events
German films based on actual events
2010s English-language films
2010s American films
2010s British films
2010s German films